Sackett v. Environmental Protection Agency (Docket 21–454), also known as Sackett II (to distinguish it from the 2012 case), is a pending United States Supreme Court case related to the scope of the Clean Water Act.

Background 

Chantell and Michael Sackett purchased a 0.63-acre vacant lot near Priest Lake, Idaho, in 2004. They began construction of their home in the spring of 2007, after attaining building permits from local authorities. Shortly after, officials from the United States Environmental Protection Agency informed the Sacketts that their lot might be subject to regulation under the Clean Water Act, as it contained "wetlands" that were "navigable waters". The EPA directed the Sacketts to halt construction until they received a permit from the United States Army Corps of Engineers. The Sacketts received an administrative compliance order from the EPA in the fall of 2007. In 2008, they sued under the Administrative Procedure Act. The lower courts held EPA compliance orders were not subject to the APA, but the Supreme Court reversed in a 2012 decision of the same name.

In the 2006 Rapanos v. United States decision, the Supreme Court decided the scope of the Clean Water Act in a 4–1–4 opinion. Justice Anthony Kennedy's solo concurrence offered a more sweeping interpretation of the Act's jurisdiction over navigable waters; Justice Antonin Scalia's plurality offered the narrowest interpretation. The Sacketts argued to the United States District Court for the District of Idaho on remand from the Supreme Court that their land was not subject to the CWA. In 2019, the district court applied Justice Kennedy's test and held the lot was regulated by the CWA. The United States Court of Appeals for the Ninth Circuit affirmed in August 2021, and rejected an attempt by the EPA to moot the litigation by withdrawing the compliance order. 

The Sacketts filed a petition for a writ of certiorari. The petitioners seek to determine whether the Rapanos decision should be revisited to instead adopt the plurality opinion's test to determine whether a wetland fell under the Clean Water Act's jurisdiction. Amici curiae in support of the Sacketts were submitted by the Cato Institute, the US Chamber of Commerce, and Americans for Prosperity, while the Constitutional Accountability Center, Public Citizen, and major American scientific societies like the Association for the Sciences of Limnology and Oceanography, and Society of Wetland Scientists filed amici supporting the EPA.

Supreme Court 

Certiorari was granted in the case on January 24, 2022 and the court heard oral arguments on October 3, 2022.

Related Cases 
Related cases include Rapanos v. United States, Orchard Hill Bldg. Co. v. United States Army Corps of Eng’rs, Sackett v. EPA (2012), and United States v. Riverside Bayview.

References

External links 

2023 in United States case law
United States administrative case law
United States environmental case law
United States Supreme Court cases
United States Supreme Court cases of the Roberts Court